Amina Chifupa (20 May 1981 – 26 June 2007) was a Tanzanian CCM politician and a special seat Member of Parliament.

References

1976 births
2007 deaths
Chama Cha Mapinduzi MPs
Tanzanian MPs 2005–2010